Veepee (named vente-privee.com until January 2019) is a French retailer company that sells products through online flash sales. The site, that celebrated its 10th anniversary in 2011, was developed in an online environment to host sales of designer brands only for members with discounted prices from 50% to 70% off. These sales include a diverse selection of product categories: fashion, accessories, toys, watches, home appliances, sports equipment, technology, and wines. The site has diversified its offers and now even travel, entertainment tickets and music are on sale. For example, the 2012 album of the punk legend Iggy Pop, "Après", was launched by the site.

History
vente-privee.com was founded in 2001 by the current CEO, Jacques-Antoine Granjon, and his seven business partners.

At the end of 2000 Granjon and his associates began to conceptualise the sale of end-of-season and overstock inventory through limited-time sales events on the internet. The principle was to fulfil supplier's needs to quickly sell excess inventory, without harming the brand's image or competing with other distribution channels. 
On 26 July 2007, Summit Partners acquired a 20% stake in vente-privee.com. The funding helped the company expand in Europe: first in Spain and Germany, then in Italy and UK, and more recently in Belgium, Austria and The Netherlands. In late 2011, vente-privee, in a join venture with American Express, launched the site in the US. However, it was announced in October 2014 that the US branch would be closed by the end of the year. Until 2009 one had to be recommended by a member to become a member.

In 2006, the company grew quickly in Europe after opening its website and starting up subsidiaries in various European markets aiming to create a closer relationship with local brands. Since 2016, that growth has been boosted by acquiring stakes in leading strategic players that are profitable on their markets or buying them outright: vente-exclusive in Benelux, Privalia in Spain, Italy, Brazil and Mexico, Eboutic.ch in Switzerland, Designers&Friends in Denmark and ZloteWyprzedaze in Poland.

In January 2020, the name of the company changed to "Veepee", a global brand found in 12 European countries.

Entertainment
Since 2014, vente-privee completed the successive acquisitions of three theaters (Théâtre de Paris, Théâtre de la Michodière, Théâtre des Bouffes Parisiens).
In June 2017, vente-privee continued its diversification strategy by launching a new platform offering multi-theme tickets at reduced prices: panda-ticket.com.

Open Innovation
In 2017, vente-privee invested 80 million euros and accelerated its R&D and Open Innovation policy. The group rolled out three projects: Veepee Impusle : a Fashion/Tech/Retail start-up accelerator inside Station F,  two in-house Lab’innovation in partnership with Epitech and 42 and launched a recruitment plan for 250 IT talents.

References

Bibliography
 Michael Barnett, 8 March 2012, Strategic Inconvenience, Marketing Week
Marketing Week | marketing news, opinion, trends and jobs
 Isabella Naef, 13 October 2011, Granjon: Smartphone will be magic wand of consumption, Fashion United
Fashion news, Fashion jobs, network, career, job board, designer jobs, fashionjobs, London, UK Eve Oxberry, 18 février 2010, Vente-privee reports 33% sales uplift, Retail Week
Vente-privee reports 33% sales uplift
 Eve Oxberry, 18 février 2010, Vente-privee plans UK growth after strong 2009, DrapersVente-privee plans UK growth after strong 2009

External links
 vente-privee.com website

Online marketplaces of France